Roseville is a settlement on Prince Edward Island.

Communities in Prince County, Prince Edward Island